Small talk is an informal type of conversation.

Small talk, Small Talk, or Smalltalk may also refer to:
Smalltalk, a computer programming language

Film and television
Small Talk (1929 film), a 1929 Our Gang short comedy film, the first with sound
Small Talk (2016 film), a 2016 Taiwanese documentary film
Chhoti Si Baat or Small Talk, a 1975 Hindi romantic comedy film
Small Talk (British game show), a 1994–1996 show hosted by Ronnie Corbett
Small Talk (American game show), a 1996–1997 show hosted by Wil Shriner

Music
Small Talk (Sly and the Family Stone album), 1974
Small Talk (Twenty Twenty album), 2011
Small Talk (EP), an EP by MNEK
"Small Talk" (song), a 2019 song by Katy Perry
"Smalltalk", a song by Ultraísta from their eponymous debut album
"Small Talk", a song from the 1954 musical The Pajama Game
"Small Talk", a song by Scritti Politti from the 1985 album Cupid & Psyche 85
"Small Talk", a song by Roxette from the 1991 album Joyride
"Small Talk", a song by Saving Aimee from the 2009 album We're the Good Guys
"Small Talk", a song by The Story So Far from the 2013 album What You Don't See